The women's Mass Start at the 2022 KNSB Dutch Single Distance Championships in Heerenveen took place at Thialf ice skating rink on Sunday 31 October 2021. Although the tournament was held in 2021 it was the 2022 edition as it was part of the 2021–2022 speed skating season. There were 25 participants.

Result 

Referee: Dina Melis.  Starter: Janny Smegen 
Start: 17:38.00 hr. Finish: 17:47.25 hr.

Source:

References

Single Distance Championships
2022 Single Distance
World